Troika Games was an American video game developer co-founded by Jason Anderson, Tim Cain, and Leonard Boyarsky. The company was focused on role-playing video games between 1998 and 2005, best known for Arcanum: Of Steamworks and Magick Obscura and Vampire: The Masquerade – Bloodlines.

History

In 1997, Tim Cain, Leonard Boyarsky, and Jason Anderson worked on the Fallout sequel at Interplay. Finishing the initial design for Fallout 2, they were unable to come to an agreement with Interplay about the future team structure. They decided to leave Interplay to form a company that felt more like the old Interplay, producing role-playing video games for PC in 1997. They formed their company on April 1, 1998, calling their new company Troika Games (a Russian word "Тройка" meaning "three of a kind") since they were the three key developers behind the critically acclaimed Fallout. They initially planned to do games exclusively for one publisher (Sierra Entertainment), but a different company published each game. After being unable to secure funding for future projects, they were forced to lay off their staff in late 2004 and later closed their doors on February 24, 2005.

Games
In 1998, Troika started designing a steampunk fantasy crossover role-playing video game named Arcanum: Of Steamworks and Magick Obscura and convinced Sierra Entertainment to publish it. The game was launched on August 21, 2001. While criticized for being unpolished and having a bad combat engine, it received generally favorable reviews, averaging 81% on Metacritic. With 234,000 units sold, it is Troika's best-selling game. In 2016 it was released on Steam, where as of March 2017, it has over 95,000 owners.

After Arcanum was released in 2001, two teams started to work on two different games. One team created The Temple of Elemental Evil for publisher Atari which was released on September 26, 2003. It was lauded for the good implementation of the D&D 3.5 system, but overall it got mixed reviews due to gameplay bugs and a lack of a plot. With a 71% on Metacritic, it was the lowest-rated Troika game. It sold about 128,000 units.

The other team worked for Activision on Vampire: The Masquerade – Bloodlines. Using an early version of the Source engine, development was finished in October 2004. Due to contractual obligations with Valve, Activision was not allowed to release the game before Valve released Half-Life 2, scheduled for release in November 2004.  Troika Games used the interim period to code a patch into the main program. Bloodlines was released on November 16, 2004 (the same day as Half-Life 2). Critics praised Bloodlines visuals, audio, and story but warned of bugs. It got a rating of 80% on Metacritic and sold merely 72,000 units on its original release. With the addition of the game to the digital distributors Direct2Drive and Steam in 2016, many units were sold digitally.  As of March 2017, approximately 550,000 people own the game on Steam.

In 2004, Troika tried to find a publisher for an unnamed post-apocalyptic role-playing video game but was unsuccessful, leading to rumors in January 2005 that the company had already shut down. Screenshots of the unnamed game were posted in 2004 to the Fallout fan sites "No Mutants Allowed" and "Duck and Cover". A tech demo video was released in early 2005, weeks before closing. Tim Cain later confirmed that this was supposed to be a sequel to Fallout: "Leonard pursued Fallout 3, which ultimately went to Bethesda, who outbid us."

List of games

References

External links
Official website via Internet Archive
Troika Games profile on MobyGames
The Escapist - The Rise and Fall of Troika

 
Video game development companies
Video game companies established in 1998
Video game companies disestablished in 2005
Defunct video game companies of the United States
Defunct companies based in Greater Los Angeles
1998 establishments in California
2005 disestablishments in California
Privately held companies based in California